Anela is a comune (municipality) in the Province of Sassari in the Italian island region Sardinia, located about  north of Cagliari and about  southeast of Sassari.

Anela borders the following municipalities: Bono, Bultei, Nughedu San Nicolò. 

Anela, the oldest village of Goceano is known for Forest'Anela an holm oak woods very popular for trekking tourism
and Necropolis of Sos Furrighesos.

References

External links
Official website

Cities and towns in Sardinia
Articles which contain graphical timelines